The 1989 European Tour, titled as the 1989 Volvo Tour for sponsorship reasons, was the 18th official season of golf tournaments known as the PGA European Tour. It marked the tour's first visit to Asia, with the inaugural Karl Litten Desert Classic.

The season was made up of 33 tournaments counting for the Order of Merit, and ten non-counting "Approved Special Events".

The Order of Merit was won by Northern Ireland's Ronan Rafferty.

Changes for 1989
There were several changes from the previous season, with the addition of the Tenerife Open, the Dubai Desert Classic, the Volvo Open Championship, the Murphy's Cup (an approved special event), the BMW International Open and the Catalan Open, which replaced the cancelled Barcelona Open. A renewal of the Europcar Cup, a team event which debuted in 1988, was planned but was ultimately cancelled.

Schedule
The following table lists official events during the 1989 season.

Unofficial events
The following events were sanctioned by the European Tour, but did not carry official money, nor were wins official.

Order of Merit
The Order of Merit was titled as the Volvo Order of Merit and was based on prize money won during the season, calculated in Pound sterling.

Awards

See also
List of golfers with most European Tour wins

Notes

References

External links
1989 season results on the PGA European Tour website
1989 Order of Merit on the PGA European Tour website

European Tour seasons
European Tour